A shelf corporation, shelf company, or aged corporation is a company or corporation that has had no activity. It was created and left with no activity – metaphorically put on the "shelf" to "age".  The company can then be sold to a person or group of persons who wish to start a company without going through all the procedures of creating a new one.

Reasons for buying
Common reasons for buying a shelf corporation include:
 To save the time involved in taking the steps to create a new corporation.
 To gain the opportunity to bid on contracts. Some jurisdictions require that a company be in business for a certain length of time to have this ability.
 To show corporate longevity in order to attract consumers or investors.
 To gain access to corporate credit.

These reasons are open to criticism.  Many years ago, it would take months to properly incorporate a business.  However, it is now quite easy, at least in Australia, Canada, the United States, Western Europe and Dubai, to do so.  In fact, it can now be done in as little as a couple of hours in some jurisdictions. In Australia, a new company can get registered within 10 minutes. A corporation might end up "on the shelf" precisely because of a bad business history.

A number of consortia "produce" and sell shelf corporations, promoting the fact that the new buyer can at the same time have a corporation with a long history, and yet have complete control over the establishment of the corporation's board of directors and shareholder profile.

One item to be aware of is the re-aging of the shelf corporation. If the credit bureaus learn about the company being under new management, they will list it on their reports, effectively "re-aging" the company.

Examples
A Reuters report described Wyoming Corporate Services as an example of a vendor of shelf companies, which were literally stored in mailboxes labelled as "corporate suites" in the main room of a  brick house a few blocks from the Wyoming State Capitol.  Over 700 companies were available at prices depending on their age, ranging from $5,995 for a six-year-old company to $645 for one recently created.  It is one of scores of similar businesses setting up shop, primarily in Delaware, Wyoming, and Nevada due to regulatory considerations.

See also 

 Seasoned tradeline

References

Further reading
 Michael Spadaccini, Incorporate Your Business: In Any State (2007), p. 253.
 Mark William Walma, Patricia McCann-Smith, The Fundamentals of Corporate Law and Procedure (2000), p. 54.

Types of business entity
Corporations